Velle may refer to:

Places
Velle, Møre og Romsdal, a village in Ørsta municipality in Møre og Romsdal county, Norway
Velle, Trøndelag (also Velde or Vellamelen), a village in Steinkjer municipality in Trøndelag county, Norway
Velle, Rogaland, a village in Karmøy municipality in Rogaland county, Norway
Velle reservoir, a reservoir on the Minho River in Galicia, Spain
Velle-le-Châtel, a commune in Haute-Saône department, France
Velle-sur-Moselle, a commune in Meurthe-et-Moselle department, France

People
Gaston Velle (1868–1953), a French filmmaker 
Marit Velle Kile (born 1978), a Norwegian actress appearing in film and television 
Weiert Velle (1925–2007), a Norwegian veterinarian
William E. Tou Velle (1862–1951), a United States Representative from Ohio
Velle Kadalipp (born 1963), an Estonian architect

Other
Velle (film), a 2021 Hindi-language crime comedy film
Velle derrick, a lifting device, particularly one used on oil fields

See also
Velles (disambiguation)